The 2018 season was Davao Aguilas Football Club's 2nd in existence and the 2nd season in the top flight of Philippine football. The club participated in the Philippines Football League and Copa Paulino Alcantara.

Players

Transfers

In

Out

Loans out

Pre-season and friendlies

Competitions

Overview

Philippines Football League

Results summary

Results by round

Matches

Note:
 a  Due to the bad condition of the pitch in the Cebu City Sports Complex, the match will be played in neutral venue Rizal Memorial Stadium or.Biñan Football Stadium.
 b  Due to the unavailability of Davao del Norte Sports Complex, the match will be played in neutral venue Rizal Memorial Stadium.
 c  Due to the unavailability of Marikina Sports Complex, the match will be played in neutral venue Biñan Football Stadium or PFF National Training Centre.
 d  Originally schedule on 3 July but the match was abandoned by Global Cebu. Davao Aguilas won 3–0 by default.

Copa Paulino Alcantara

Group stage

Note:
 a  Due to the unavailability of Panaad Stadium, the match will be played in neutral venue Rizal Memorial Stadium.
 b  Due to the unavailability of Davao del Norte Sports Complex, the match will be played in neutral venue Rizal Memorial Stadium.

Knockout stage

Statistics

Goalscorers

Clean sheets

References

External links 
 Davao Aguilas F.C. – Philippines Football League
 Main Website

Davao Aguilas 2018
Davao Aguilas 2018